This is a list of political offices which have been held by a woman, with details of the first woman holder of each office. It is ordered by the countries in South America and by dates of appointment. Please observe that this list is meant to contain only the first woman to hold of a political office, and not all the female holders of that office.

Argentina

 Head of Ministries (Labour, Social Welfare, Health) – Eva Perón – 1946
 President of a Major Political Party – Eva Perón – 1947
 First women in Congress – Twenty-two peronist women – 1951 
 Vice President of the Chamber of Deputies – Delia Parodi – 1953
 Minister of the Supreme Court – Margarita Argúas – 1970
 Vice President of Argentina – Isabel Perón – 1973
 President of the Argentine Senate – Isabel Perón – 1973
 President of Argentina  – Isabel Perón – 1974
Foreign Minister (also first female Cabinet Minister) – Susana Ruiz Cerutti – 1989
 Provincial governor – Alicia Lemme – 2001 (of San Luis Province)
 Defense Minister – Nilda Garré – 2005
 Economy Minister – Felisa Miceli – 2005
 Elected President of Argentina – Cristina Fernández de Kirchner – December 10, 2007
 Elected provincial governor – Fabiana Ríos – December 10, 2007 (of Tierra del Fuego Province)

Bolivia

 Minister of Labour and Health – Alcira Espinoza Schmidt de Villegas – 1969
 President (acting) – Lidia Gueiler Tejada – 1979
Minister of Justice - Ana Maria Cortez de Soriano - 1997 
 Interior minister – Alicia Muñoz Alá – 2006
 Minister of Planning and Environment – Gloria McPhee
Defense Minister - María Cecilia Chacón - 2011

Brazil

Empire of Brazil:
1871: Senator – Isabel, Princess Imperial

Republic of the United States of Brazil:
1927: Elected Mayor (Lages) – Alzira Soriano
1933: Federal Deputy – Carlota Pereira de Queirós
United States of Brazil:
1958: Elected Mayor (Quixeramobim) – Aldamira Guedes Fernandes
1962: Secretary of Social Service – Sandra Martins Cavalcanti de Albuquerque
Federative Republic of Brazil:
1979: Senator of the Republic (Amazonas) – Eunice Michilles
1982: Minister of Education – Esther Figueiredo Ferraz 
1986: State Governor (Acre) – Iolanda Fleming
1989: Minister of Labour – Dorothea Werneck
1990: Minister of Economy – Zélia Cardoso de Melo
1990: Elected Senators – Júnia Marise (Minas Gerais) and Marluce Pinto (Roraima)
1993: Minister of Planning – Yeda Crusius
1993: Minister of Transportation – Margarida Coimbra do Nascimento
1995: Elected Governor (Maranhão) – Roseana Sarney
1995: Minister of Industry, Commerce and Tourism – Dorothea Werneck
2002: Minister of National Integration – Mary Dayse Kynzo
2003: Minister of Natural Environment – Marina Silva
2003: Secretary for Women's Rights – Emília Fernandes
2003: Secretary for Promotion of Racial Equality – Matilde Ribeiro
2003: Minister of Energy – Dilma Rousseff
2005: Chief of Staff – Dilma Rousseff
2007: Minister of Tourism – Marta Suplicy
2010: Minister of Social Development and Hunger Alleviation – Márcia Lopes
2011: Minister of Culture – Ana de Hollanda
2011: Minister of Fishing and Aquaculture – Ideli Salvatti
2011: Secretary for Human Rights – Maria do Rosário
2011: Secretary for Social Communication – Helena Chagas
2011: President – Dilma Rousseff

Chile

 Mayor – Alicia Cañas – 1935
 Mayor of Providencia – Alicia Cañas – 1935
 Mayor of Santiago – Graciela Contreras – January 6, 1939
 Mayor of Pichilemu – Olga Maturana Espinosa – 1952
 Mayor of Concepción – Ester Roa – 1958
 Mayor of Las Condes – Silvia Boza – 1968
 Governor – Olga Boettcher – March 12, 1941
Governor of La Unión Department – Olga Boetther – March 12, 1941
 Governor of Tamarugal Province – Gabriela Hip – October 8, 2007
 Intendant – Inés Enríquez – 1950
  Intendant of Concepción – Inés Enríquez – 1950
 Intendant of the Santiago Metropolitan Region – Ximena Rincón – January 25, 2005
 Deputy – Inés Enríquez – 1951
 Deputy for Concepción – Inés Enríquez – 1951
 Minister – Adriana Olguín de Baltra – 1952
Minister of Justice – Adriana Olguín de Baltra – 1952
Minister of Education – María Teresa del Canto – 1952
 Minister of Labour and Social Welfare – Mireya Baltra – 1972-1973
 Minister of National Resources (Ministra de Bienes Nacionales) – Adriana Delpiano – March 11, 1994
 Minister of Foreign Relations – Soledad Alvear – March 11, 2000
 Minister of Health – Michelle Bachelet – March 11, 2000
 Minister of Planning and Cooperation (MIDEPLAN) – Alejandra Krauss – January 7, 2002
 Minister of Defense – Michelle Bachelet – March 11, 2002
 Minister of Housing, Urban Development and National Goods – Sonia Tschorne – September 29, 2004
 Minister Secretary-General of the Presidency – Paulina Veloso – March 11, 2006
 Minister of Economy, Development and Reconstruction – Ingrid Antonijevic – March 11, 2006
 Minister of Mining and Energy – Karen Poniachik – March 11, 2006
 Minister President of the National Council of Culture and the Arts – Paulina Urrutia – March 11, 2006
 Minister General Secretary of Government – Carolina Tohá – March 11, 2009
 Ministry of Public Works – Loreto Silva – 2012
 Minister of Transport and Telecommunications – Paola Tapia – March 14, 2017
Senator – María de la Cruz – February 13, 1953
Senator (Santiago) – María de la Cruz – February 13, 1953
Supreme Court Justice – María Antonia Morales – November 5, 2001
President of the Christian Democrat Party (PDC) - Soledad Alvear - 2006 
President of the Chamber of Deputies – Adriana Muñoz – March 11, 2002
President of Chile  – Michelle Bachelet  – March 11, 2006
 President of the Senate – Isabel Allende – March 11, 2014

Colombia

 Secretary of Social Assistance of the Presidency – María Eugenia Rojas Correa de Moreno-Díaz – 1954
Governor of Cauca (first governor, nominated by President) – Josefina Valencia de Hubach – 1955
Minister of Education (first cabinet post) – Josefina Valencia de Hubach – 1956
Senator – Esmeralda Arboleda – 1958
Presidential candidate – María Eugenia Rojas – 1974
Minister of Justice - Mónica de Greiff - 1989 
Minister of Foreign Affairs – Noemí Sanín – 1991
Governor of Quindío (first governor elected) – Belén Sánchez – 1992
Minister with presidential functions (acting President) – María Emma Mejía – 1998
President of the Chamber of Representatives of Colombia – Nancy Patricia Gutiérrez – 1999 
 Minister of Defense – Marta Lucía Ramírez de Rincón – August 2002
President of the Senate of Colombia – Claudia Blum de Barbieri – July 2005
General (National Police) - Luz Marina Bustos - 2009

Ecuador

 Minister of Interior – Nela Martínez – 1944
 Minister of Social Affairs – Margarita Cedeños de Armijos – 1979
 President (acting) – Rosalía Arteaga – 1997
 Foreign minister – Nina Pacari Vega – 2003 
 Defence minister – Guadalupe Larriva González – 2007
Minister of Justice - Ledy Zúñiga Rocha - 2014

Falkland Islands

 Elected Member of the Legislative Council (for East Falkland)– Marjorie Vinson – 1964
 Governor – Alison Blake – 2022

Guyana

 Deputy Speaker of the National Assembly of Guyana – Janet Jagan – 1953
 President – Janet Jagan – 1997
 Prime Minister – Janet Jagan – 1997
 Minister of Foreign Affairs – Carolyn Rodrigues – 2008

Paraguay

 Member of the Supreme Court – Serafina Dávalos – 1908
 Minister of Health and Social Affairs – Maria Cynthia Prieto Conti de Alegre – 1989
 Minister of Foreign Affairs – Leila Rachid de Cowles – 2003
 Minister of Public Health and Social Welfare – Esperanza Martínez (politician) – 2008
 Minister of Education and Culture – Blanca Ovelar – 2003
 Presidential Candidate – Blanca Ovelar – 2008
 Minister of Indigenous Affairs – Margarita Mbywangi – 2008
 Minister of Women – Gloria Rubin – 2012
 Minister of Justice and Labor – Sheila Abed – 2013

Peru

 Senator of the Republic – Irene Silva de Santolalla – 1956
 Deputy of the Republic – Matilde Pérez Palacio – 1956
 Mayor of Lima –  Anita Fernandini de Naranjo – 1963
 Minister of Education – Mercedes Cabanillas – 1987 (first woman ever in the Council of Ministers)
 President of Congress – Martha Chávez – 1995
 Prime Minister – Beatriz Merino – 2003
 Minister of Health – Pilar Mazzetti – 2004
Ombudswoman of the Republic – Beatriz Merino – 2005
 Minister of Interior – Pilar Mazzetti – 2006
Minister of Justice and Human Rights of Peru - María Bockos Heredia de Grillo -1989 
Minister of Foreign Commerce and Tourism – Mercedes Aráoz – 2006
Minister of Transportation and Communications – Verónica Zavala – 2006
Minister of Work and Employment – Susana Pinilla – 2006
 President (acting) – Lourdes Mendoza – 2007 (Alan García went to Ecuador, so she stayed in charge of the Presidency for one day)
 Minister of Foreign Affairs – Eda Rivas – 2013

Suriname

 Minister of Social Affairs and Housing – Siegmien Staphorst – 1980
Minister of Justice and Police - Yvonne Raveles-Resida - 1999
Foreign minister – Marie Levens – 2000

Uruguay

Legislative Power
Deputies – Julia Arévalo de Roche, Magdalena Antonelli Moreno – 1943
Senators – Sofía Álvarez Vignoli, Isabel Pinto de Vidal – 1943
Cabinet member - Alba Roballo - 1968 
Member of the Board of the National Party and Minister of Labor and Social Welfare - Ana Lía Piñeyrúa - 1995
Speaker of the Chamber of Deputies – Nora Castro – 2005
Speaker of the General Assembly – Lucía Topolansky – 15 February 2010 / Beatriz Argimón – 1 March 2020 
Acting President of the Republic – Lucía Topolansky – 26–28 November 2010

Municipal
Member of municipal council – Alba Roballo – 1955
Intendant of Montevideo – Ana Olivera – 2010
Intendant of Artigas – Patricia Ayala – 2010
Intendant of Lavalleja – Adriana Peña – 2010
Intendant of San José – Ana María Bentaberri – 2020

National Government
Minister of Culture – Alba Roballo – 1968
Ministry of Labour and Social Welfare – Ana Lía Piñeyrúa – 1995
Ministry of Housing, Territorial Planning and Environment – Beatriz Martínez – 1999
Minister of Industry, Energy and Mining – Primavera Garbarino – 2000
Minister of National Defense – Azucena Berrutti – 2005
Minister of Public Health – María Julia Muñoz – 2005
Minister of Social Development – Marina Arismendi – 2005
Minister of the Interior – Daisy Tourné – 2007
Minister of Tourism – Liliam Kechichián – 2012
Minister of Economy and Finance - Azucena Arbeleche - 2020

Judiciary
Member of the Supreme Court (Dictatorial period)– Sara Fons de Genta – 1981  
Member of the Supreme Court (Post-Democracy)- Jacinta Balbela – 1985

Venezuela

 Constituent Assembly representative – Mercedes Carvajal de Arocha – 1947
Senator – Mercedes Carvajal de Arocha – 1948
Minister of Development – Aura Celina Casanova – 1969
Presidential candidate – Ismenia Villalba – 1988
Mayor of Chacao – Irene Sáez – 1992
 Governor – Lolita Aniyar de Castro – 1993
 Governor of Zulia – Lolita Aniyar de Castro – 1993
 President of the Chamber of Deputies – Ixora Rojas Paz – 1998
 Vice President – Adina Bastidas – 2002
 President of the National Assembly – Cilia Flores – 2006
Minister of the Prison Service - Iris Varela - 2011 
 Minister of Defense - Carmen Meléndez - 2013
 Foreign minister – Delcy Rodríguez – 2014

See also
List of elected and appointed female heads of state
List of elected or appointed female heads of government
List of the first LGBT holders of political offices
List of the first women holders of political offices in North and Central America and the Caribbean

References

South America
South America-related lists
Women in South America